The enzyme pectate disaccharide-lyase catalyzes the following process:

(1,4-α-D-galacturonosyl)n = (1,4-α-D-galacturonosyl)n–2 + 4-(4-deoxy-α-D-galact-4-enuronosyl)-D-galacturonate

This enzyme belongs to the family of lyases, specifically those carbon-oxygen lyases acting on polysaccharides.  The systematic name of this enzyme class is (1→4)-alpha-D-galacturonan reducing-end-disaccharide-lyase. Other names in common use include pectate exo-lyase, exopectic acid transeliminase, exopectate lyase, exopolygalacturonic acid-trans-eliminase, PATE, exo-PATE, and exo-PGL.

References 

 

EC 4.2.2
Enzymes of unknown structure